At the 1963 GANEFO, the athletics events were held in Jakarta, Indonesia in November. A total of 21 men's and 12 women's athletics events were contested at the competition.

Given that the Soviet Union sent a lower standard of athletes to the games, China dominated the athletics competition. China won all but three of the women's events and won eleven gold medals in the men's section. The second most successful nation was North Korea, which won four gold medals, led by a triple gold medal performance by Sin Kim-dan. The next most successful nation was the United Arab Republic (combining Egypt and Syria), which swept the men's distance track events, and also won four gold medals.

This was a major international event for Chinese and North Korean athletes in particular, as they were excluded from the Asian Games, including the 1962 Jakarta Games held a year earlier. The Asian Games sprint and hurdles champion Mohammad Sarengat by China's Gao Jiqiao. Ni Zhiqin won the men's high jump and would break the world record in that event later in his career. His counterpart on the women's side Zheng Fengrong was similarly successful, having become the first Chinese world record breaker in 1957 – here she was only runner-up (behind her teammate Wu Fushan) but won the women's pentathlon event. Another high-profile competitor was men's long jump winner Ali Brakchi, an Algerian who represented France at the 1960 Summer Olympics.

Medal summary

Men

Women

References

Medalists
GANEFO Games. GBR Athletics. Retrieved on 2015-01-14.

GANEFO
1963 GANEFO
GANEFO athletics
1963 GANEFO